Vinkebrug is a hamlet in the Dutch province of North Holland.

References

Populated places in North Holland
Haarlemmermeer